The 2018 Iowa 250 presented by Enogen was the 14th stock car race of the 2018 NASCAR Xfinity Series season and the 8th iteration of the event. The race was held on Sunday, June 17, 2018, in Newton, Iowa at Iowa Speedway, a 7⁄8 mile (1.4 km) permanent D-shaped oval racetrack. The race took the scheduled 250 laps to complete. At race's end, JR Motorsports driver Justin Allgaier would dominate the race to win his seventh career NASCAR Xfinity Series win and his second of the season. To fill out the podium, Christopher Bell of Joe Gibbs Racing and Daniel Hemric of Richard Childress Racing would finish second and third, respectively.

Background 

Iowa Speedway is a 7/8-mile (1.4 km) paved oval motor racing track in Newton, Iowa, United States, approximately 30 miles (48 km) east of Des Moines. The track was designed with influence from Rusty Wallace and patterned after Richmond Raceway, a short track where Wallace was very successful. It has over 25,000 permanent seats as well as a unique multi-tiered Recreational Vehicle viewing area along the backstretch.

Entry list

Practice

First practice 
The first practice session was held on Saturday, June 16, at 2:05 PM CST, and would last for 50 minutes.

Second and final practice 
The second and final practice session, sometimes referred to as Happy Hour, was held on Saturday, June 16, at 4:40 PM CST, and would last for 50 minutes.

Qualifying 
Qualifying was held on Sunday, June 17, at 1:35 PM CST. Since Iowa Speedway is under 2 miles (3.2 km), the qualifying system was a multi-car system that included three rounds. The first round was 15 minutes, where every driver would be able to set a lap within the 15 minutes. Then, the second round would consist of the fastest 24 cars in Round 1, and drivers would have 10 minutes to set a lap. Round 3 consisted of the fastest 12 drivers from Round 2, and the drivers would have 5 minutes to set a time. Whoever was fastest in Round 3 would win the pole.

No drivers would fail to qualify.

Full qualifying results

Race results 
Stage 1 Laps: 60

Stage 2 Laps: 60

Stage 3 Laps: 130

References 

2018 NASCAR Xfinity Series
NASCAR races at Iowa Speedway
June 2018 sports events in the United States
2018 in sports in Iowa